Survivor: One World is the 24th season of the American CBS competitive reality television series Survivor, featuring 18 new castaways divided by gender into two tribes of nine. The season was filmed from August 1 through September 8, 2011 in the vicinity of Upolu, Samoa, which is the same filming location used for seasons 19, 20, and 23, surpassed Panama as the most Survivor seasons have filmed. The season aired weekly from February 15, 2012 until May 13, 2012, when Kim Spradlin was named the winner over Sabrina Thompson and Chelsea Meissner by a 7–2–0 vote. In addition, Spradlin won $100,000 as the "Sprint Player of the Season", earning the fans' vote over runners-up Meissner, Greg "Tarzan" Smith and "Troyzan" Robertson.

This is the fourth season that initially divided the tribes by gender, following Survivor: The Amazon, Survivor: Vanuatu and Survivor: Panama. The season's title is in reference to the two tribes initially sharing a campsite; while this had been done in Survivor: Thailand and Survivor: Palau, this is the first time the concept was both employed at the beginning of the game and continued beyond the first tribal challenge. As a result of the shared campsite, hidden immunity idols were designated for specific tribes; if a castaway found the idol designated for the opposing tribe, he or she was required to give it to a member of the other tribe before the next Tribal Council. All of these twists ended when the tribes were reorganized on Day 12.

Contestants
The cast is composed of 18 new players, initially divided into two tribes by gender: the nine men composed Manono (named after Manono Island) while the nine women composed Salani (named after a Samoan surfing resort). The merged tribe Tikiano is coined from a portmanteau of "Tiki" which means "God", and "Ano" derived from Spanish año for "year", which was first suggested by contestant Troy "Troyzan" Robertson.

Notable cast members include Leif Manson, the first little person to compete in the whole Survivor franchise; fashion photographer "Troyzan" Robertson; and Monica Culpepper, wife of former NFL football player Brad Culpepper (who would later also become a contestant on Survivor).

Future appearances
Kat Edorsson, Colton Cumbie, and Monica Culpepper returned for Survivor: Blood vs. Water. Edorsson returned with her boyfriend, Hayden Moss, Cumbie returned with his fiancé, Caleb Bankston, and Culpepper returned with her husband, Brad. "Troyzan" Robertson and Sabrina Thompson were both included in the public poll to choose the cast of Survivor: Cambodia, but neither of them were chosen to compete. Robertson would eventually return for Survivor: Game Changers. Culpepper also appeared on Survivor: Game Changers as part of the loved ones visit. Kim Spradlin, now using her married name of Spradlin-Wolfe, returned to compete on Survivor: Winners at War.

Outside of Survivor, Michael Jefferson appeared on the Discovery Channel show Naked and Afraid. Chelsea Meissner joined the Bravo reality series Southern Charm as a recurring cast member in season four, and was promoted to a main cast member for seasons five and six.

Season summary
The 18 castaways were divided into gender-based tribes and given maps to their camps, unaware they would lead to the same location.  Despite living on the same beach, the tribes would remain split, building separate shelters and fending for their own tribe.

The men's tribe, Manono, dominated the first few challenges. The women's tribe, Salani, was run by a majority alliance formed by Alicia, Chelsea, Kat, Kim and Sabrina. Despite a strong start, the men found difficulty with the outspoken Colton who was initially an outsider, often interacting with Salani instead. After Sabrina accidentally found Manono's hidden immunity idol, she gave it to Colton, who used his newfound power to overthrow Manono's dominant alliance and gain control of the tribe. After the tribes were swapped, Colton found himself again in a position of power on the new Manono tribe; however, he was medically evacuated from the game after being diagnosed with acute appendicitis. Meanwhile, on the new Salani tribe, Kim and Chelsea formed a second alliance with Jay and Troyzan as a backup plan in case their original alliance failed.

Though the genders entered the merge with equal numbers, Kim organized the women into a single alliance while Colton's removal left the men without a leader, leading Jay and Troyzan to align with the women and vote out two of the men. With a clear majority, the women decided to sever ties with Jay and Troyzan, voting them out despite Troyzan's pleas to Kat and Christina, who were at the bottom of the women's alliance. Tarzan was the last man remaining, however Kat's unpredictability and youthful naivety was enough to convince Kim to betray her first. With only six players remaining, Kim found herself caught between her initial alliance of Chelsea and Sabrina, and the alliance of Alicia, Christina and Tarzan. Although Alicia wanted to vote Chelsea out, Kim convinced Alicia that Tarzan was planning to betray her, leading to Tarzan's elimination. Alicia and Christina were subsequently voted out by Kim, Chelsea, and Sabrina.

At the Final Tribal Council, Chelsea was lambasted by the jurors for her evident lack of social connections, riding on coattails, and was largely seen as Kim's pawn. Sabrina was praised for her excellent social game, and being loyal to her allies. However, she was criticized by many jurors due to her poor work ethic and challenge performances. Kim was praised for her challenge wins, her connections with men and women, and always thinking ahead strategically. However, she was blamed for all their blindsides and eliminations. Kim decided to own every decision she made throughout the entire game, and won in a vote of 7-2-0, only losing Troyzan's and Leif's votes.

In the case of multiple tribes or castaways who win reward or immunity, they are listed in order of finish, or alphabetically where it was a team effort; where one castaway won and invited others, the invitees are in brackets.

Episodes

Voting history

Reception
Despite the absence of Redemption Island and having an all-new cast, Survivor: One World was the fourth consecutive season of the series to be met with a generally negative reception. Although the gameplay of Kim Spradlin received praise, much criticism was aimed towards the gender tribe division, as well as the season's predictability. Survivor columnist Dalton Ross of Entertainment Weekly gave this season a negative review. He called the cast, "thoroughly uninspiring" and went on to say that, "Colton was more a horrible human being than a classic villain, and the rest of the players were mostly either completely forgettable or people you wish you could forget." Ross ultimately ranked One World as the fifth-worst season of the series, only better than Thailand, Fiji, Nicaragua, and Island of the Idols. Jeff Probst felt this season was a "bit of a letdown," adding that "We just didn't have the standout moments and characters needed for a great season." From 2012 to 2014, Survivor fan site "Survivor Oz" consistently ranked One World in the bottom five in its annual polls ranking all seasons of the series; in 2012, it was the fifth-worst ahead of Fiji, Thailand, Nicaragua, and Redemption Island, and in 2013 and 2014, it was the fourth-worst ahead of Fiji, South Pacific, and Redemption Island. Similarly, fellow fan site "The Purple Rock Podcast" ranked One World as the ninth-worst season in 2020. In 2014, Joe Reid of The Wire ranked One World as the seventh-worst season, similarly criticizing Colton and saying that his "petulance, racism, snobbery, whining, and cruelty makes him very possibly the worst person to ever be on the show." In 2015, a poll by Rob Has a Podcast ranked this season as the second-worst season of all time, only ahead of Redemption Island, with Rob Cesternino ranking this season 27th. This was updated in 2021 during Cesternino's podcast, Survivor All-Time Top 40 Rankings, ranking 37th. In 2020, Inside Survivor ranked this season 37th out of 40 saying that the One World twist fell flat and the "vast majority [of the players] is either wholly forgettable or actively unlikeable."

References

External links
 Official CBS Survivor One World Website

24
2011 in Samoa
2012 American television seasons
Television shows filmed in Samoa